Charade is a 1953 black and white American anthology film directed by Roy Kellino.  It consists of a trio of short stories introduced by and starring James Mason and his wife Pamela.

Plot
In "Portrait of a Murderer," a cynical young artist (Pamela Mason) absentmindedly sketches her neighbour (James Mason) who, unbeknownst to her, is a murderer. In "Duel at Dawn," in 1880s Austria, two officers (Mason and Scott Forbes) fight a duel for the love of a Baroness (Pamela Mason). In "The Midas Touch," Jonah Watson (James Mason), a successful businessman in New York, is dissatisfied with his life, and moves to England to start again. Working as a servant, he falls in love with Lilly (Pamela Mason), a cockney maid, who dreams of bettering herself.

Cast
 James Mason as The Murderer / Maj. Linden / Jonah Watson
 Pamela Mason as The Artist / Pamela / Baroness Tanslan / Lilly
 Scott Forbes as Capt. Stamm
 Paul Cavanagh as Col. Heisler
 Bruce Lester as Capt. van Buren
 John Dodsworth as Lt. Meyerdorf
 Judy Osborne as Dotty
 Sean McClory as Jack Stuydevant
 Vince Barnett as Berg

Soundtrack

References

External links
 
 
 
 

1953 films
1950s historical comedy-drama films
1950s mystery comedy-drama films
American mystery comedy-drama films
American anthology films
American black-and-white films
Films set in London
Films set in Austria
Films set in the 1880s
American historical comedy-drama films
1953 comedy films
1953 drama films
1950s English-language films
1950s American films